Dwarika Devi Thakurani (1915–2002) was a Nepali politician, the first Nepali woman to be elected to parliament and the first woman to become a cabinet minister.

Biography 
Thakurani was born to father Bam Dev Panta and mother Radha Devi Panta on 28 November 1915 (12 Kartik 1972 BS) in Silgadhi town of Doti district in far–western region of Nepal. She died on 10 December 2002 (14 Mangsir 2059 BS).

Career
Thakurani was elected to parliament in the first democratic election of Nepal, held in February 1959. She was a candidate from Constituency No. 66, Dadeldhura District for Nepali Congress.  She was the only woman elected to the House of Representatives (out of 15 that ran), and jointly the first woman in the Nepalese parliament, alongside Kamal Rana, who had been appointed to the Senate.

Following the election, she was also appointed deputy minister of Health and Local Self-governance on 27 May 1959 in the BP Koirala cabinet, also becoming the first female minister in Nepal.

References

1915 births
2002 deaths
People from Doti District
20th-century Nepalese women
20th-century Nepalese politicians
Nepali Congress politicians from Sudurpashchim Province
Nepal MPs 1959–1960